East Staffordshire or Staffordshire East (formally the Eastern division of Staffordshire) was a county constituency in the county of Staffordshire.  It returned two Members of Parliament (MPs) to the House of Commons of the Parliament of the United Kingdom, elected by the bloc vote system.

History

The constituency was first created by the Second Reform Act for the 1868 general election, and abolished by the Redistribution of Seats Act 1885 for the 1885 general election.

Boundaries
1868–1885: The Hundreds of Offlow (North) and Offlow (South) (excluding the Townships of Willenhall and Wednesfield), and the parish of Rushall.

Members of Parliament

Election results

Elections in the 1860s

Elections in the 1870s
McClean's death caused a by-election.

Elections in the 1880s

References 

Parliamentary constituencies in Staffordshire (historic)
Constituencies of the Parliament of the United Kingdom established in 1868
Constituencies of the Parliament of the United Kingdom disestablished in 1885